The Maluti-a-Phofung Local Municipality council consists of sixty-nine members elected by mixed-member proportional representation. Thirty-five councillors are elected by first-past-the-post voting in thirty-five wards, while the remaining thirty-four are chosen from party lists so that the total number of party representatives is proportional to the number of votes received.

In the election of 3 August 2016 the African National Congress (ANC) won a majority of forty-seven seats on the council.

In the 2021 election the ANC lost its majority,  although it still won the most seats, and was unseated by a coalition lead by the MAP16 Civic Movement.

Results 
The following table shows the composition of the council after past elections.

December 2000 election

The following table shows the results of the 2000 election.

March 2006 election

The following table shows the results of the 2006 election.

May 2011 election

The following table shows the results of the 2011 election.

August 2016 election

The following table shows the results of the 2016 election.

November 2021 election

The 2021 election saw the African National Congress (ANC) lose its majority for the first time. Although it still finished with the most seats, a rival grouping led by the MAP16 Civic Movement, founded by a group of ANC councillors who had been expelled for voting to unseat the ANC mayor, who was facing corruption charges, formed a coalition to take control. Maluti-a-Phofung became the first local municipality in the Free State not to be governed by the ANC.

The following table shows the results of the 2021 election.

References

Maluti-a-Phofung
Elections in the Free State
Maluti-a-Phofung